The  Federal Polytechnic, Nekede, is a federal government-owned higher education institution located in Nekede, Owerri West local government area, Imo State, south-eastern Nigeria. It was established on a temporary site at the premise of Government Technical College by the Imo State government in 1978 as the College of Technology, Owerri before it was moved to its present location in Nekede. On April 7, the polytechnic was changed to a federal government institution and was named "The Federal Polytechnic, Nekede." The Federal Polytechnic, Nekede offers National Diploma and Higher National Diploma courses at undergraduate levels. 

On October 3, 2018, Rev. Engr. Dr. Michael Arimanwa was installed as the eighth rector of the polytechnic and the first alumnus rector of Federal Polytechnic, Nekede. Rev. Engr. Dr. Micheal Arimanwa is a priest who works in the civil engineering department. He formerly served as the department's head and as the school of engineering's dean.

Schools/Faculties 
Federal Polytechnic, Nekede has seven schools(faculties) of study: 

 School of Engineering Technology(SET),
 School of Industrial and Applied Science (SIAS),
 School of Business and Management Technology (SBMT),
 School of General Studies(SGS),
 School of Environmental Design and Technology (SEDT),
 School of Agriculture and Agricultural Technology(SAAT), and
 School of Information and Communication Technology (SICT).

Departments 
The list of departments available in the above faculties comprises the following:

In 2022, Federal Polytechnic, Nekede commenced six new academic programs namely;

 ND Animal Health and Production Technology
 ND Welding and Fabrication Engineering Technology
 ND Printing Technology
 HND Art and Design (Ceramics)
 HND Art and Design (Sculpture)
 HND Art and Design (Textile)

See also
 List of polytechnics in Nigeria

References

Federal polytechnics in Nigeria
1978 establishments in Nigeria
Educational institutions established in 1978
Education in Imo State